The interpersonal communication that occurs during a relationship deterioration/dissolution looks to explain the possible "why" behind the relationship breakup and the communication steps that a breakup seems to follow. Studies have researched on the predictors of breakups, the breakup process, the strategies employed, the impact of the breakups and finally the process to move on emotionally from the broken relationship.

Definition
Relationship dissolution "refers to the process of the breaking up of relationships (friendship, romantic, or marital relationships) by the voluntary activity of at least one partner." This article examines two types of relationship dissolution, the non-marital breakup and the marital breakup. The differences are how they are experienced, how they must be studied and how they might survive. Nonmarital breakups help us understand the nature of the issues involved and the patterns of grief experienced, they are meaningful to both persons, creating crisis in intimacy, personal and social development and future commitment expectations. Surviving a nonmarital breakup provides the opportunity to self-discovery, generosity, dignity and nobility of grief, and the promise of recovery (Weber, 1992). In marital breakups, more negotiation and delayed dissolution may occur because of the presence of children (Johnson, 1982) called a barrier force. Not all breakups should be considered a "failure", because they didn't last long enough or hit yearly marks as dictated by society. Some breakups may serve a distinct, positive change for one of the partners if there is abuse or other negative factors in the relationship.

Breakup factors
No relationship is established with the thought that it will end with heartache and grief, at least experienced by one of the couple. Why do we bother if the common belief is that at least 50% or more marriages end in divorce? Jones & Burdette, 1994, state in their work that we face two daunting risks when we pursue an intimate relationship with another: rejection and betrayal. This is countered with our social need to belong which usually trumps the risks. Hill, Rubin, and Peplau conducted a study in 1976 where 231 heterosexual couples agreed to complete a questionnaire about their relationship for two years. Only 128 couples survived the two years together, but it was the information gathered from the 103 couples that provided substantial information on  breakup factors.

Predictors
 Dissimilarity among the couples in age, education, and physical attraction
 Those who said they "loved" each other stayed together compared to those who simply "liked" each other.

Process
Hill et al. (1976) found that the peak season for a breakup is when there are changes in one's life, which may force the relationship to be examined as to whether it can be sustained over time, distance, or other change in lifestyle. Women were more likely to be the initiators of change.

Impact
 Men were hit harder by the breakup than the women in the Hill et al. study (1976), they felt more depressed, lonely, unhappy, less free—but less guilty.
 Women were less clingy and sentimental, and more pragmatic about the future of the relationship and how it would impact their lives—they had more at stake in finding the right partner.

Duck's topographical model
Steve Duck (1981) developed a topographical model of relationship disengagement and dissolution, whether married or not, in which he outlined four models of dissolution: pre-existing doom, mechanical failure, process loss and sudden death.

Pre-existing doom
 Couples who are badly  matched from the start, no matter what the initiation action involved, it could not overcome personal differences.

Mechanical failure
 When things break, where communication may be poor or interactions go badly. Without communication a relationship will never survive.

Process loss
 Relationships that die because they do not reach their potential, albeit a slow death, because of poor productivity or communication on one or both of the members of the dyad.

Sudden death
New information on a partner can produce sudden death of the new relationship with a trust violation. Davis (1973) described three conditions that produce "sudden death" in a relationship: two-sided subsidence, in which both members of the couple maintain a formal relationship with no intimacy; one-sided subsidence, where one partner is dependent and hangs on, while the other actively seeks to end the relationship; and zero-sided subsidence which is an abrupt ending primarily brought on by outside factors that makes retreat or repair impossible.

Breakup strategies
There are at least fifteen strategies used to terminate relationships and are set apart by whether they are unilateral or bilateral and indirect or direct (Baxter, 1982, 1984).

Unilateral and indirect
 Withdrawal of supportiveness and affection
 Pseudo de-escalation – purports that the relationship will benefit by separation
 Cost escalation – attempts to make the relationship unattractive to the partner
 Relational ruses – leaking an impending breakup to a friend or third party
 Avoidance behaviors|Avoidance – from complete evasion to decreased contact

Unilateral and direct
 The direct dump – simple statement that the relationship is over
 Dates with other people
 Justification – explanation why the relationship is ending
 The relationship talk trick – talking about "problems"
 Threats and bullying
 Positive tone – painting the picture that "it's nobody's fault, it's just over"
 De-escalation – breaking up to see if the relationship endures

Bilateral and indirect
 Fadeaway – both people in the relationship grow apart

Bilateral and direct
 The blame game – both partners dissatisfied and blaming each other
 Negotiated farewell – realize problems cannot be solved and negotiate breakup

Duck's Stages of dissolution
Steve Duck's (1982) four stages of relationship dissolution, each very distinctive with specific components, are moved through once one or both of the partners have crossed a cognitive threshold.

Intrapsychic stage
Intrapsychic stage begins with one partner who is dissatisfied and secretively searches for a way to "fix" the relationship. Vaughan (1986) states that uncoupling begins with a secret, and Duck asserts that the secret of unhappiness is kept that way through the intrapsychic stage.

Dyadic stage
Dyadic stage where the dissatisfied partner decides to fix the problem by confronting the other partner, thus entering into uncharted territory. This may not fix what is wrong and just continue to draw out the relationship until the unhappy partner becomes determined to depart, which will move the relationship into the next phase.

Social stage
Social stage is when the partners devise their accounts of how the breakup happened and how they will present it to their social circles. If it is in fact the end, they will cross over into the final phase of relationship dissolution.

Grave-dressing stage
Grave-dressing stage is simply the "attempt to bury and describe the relationship" stage. Partners now create an acceptable story about their love and loss, do whatever cognitive work, including introspection, attribution, rationalization, and reassessment of self and other, which is necessary in order to get over the deceased relationship.

Modification of Duck's Stage Model
Stephanie Rollie and Steve Duck (2006) subsequently modified the original model after a critique of stage models that appear to suppose an orderly and relatively conscious progression through the above stages. Proposing instead five phases of breakdown, Rollie and Duck added a Resurrection Phase which was placed after "Grave Dressing" and represented the period of reconfiguration of self and preparation for new relationships.  In the modified proposal, the authors articulated changes to communication patterns and topics that would typify each phase, but clarified that the result of the communication could at any time be not simply progression to the next phase of break up but reversion to an earlier state of the relationship.

Grief

Experience
Harvey (1996) explains that when you experience a loss or a depletion of resources, you may need some time to sort out what you had in the first place, what was given up in the breakup, and what remains for you to rely on, cherish or use. Grief is not a passive experience but a series of active choices for the grieving person to confront and resolve in either the direction of healing or prolonged suffering (Neeld, 1990).

Four central tasks of grief
Weber (1998) outlines the following central tasks for dealing with grief.
 Express your emotions. Expressing sorrow and rage is one of the central tasks of grief (Leick & Davidsen-Nielsen, 1990). Whether you express it to a sympathetic friend or write down your feelings and thoughts in a journal (Pennebaker, 1990) which can bring long-term benefits, such as greater well-being and emotional recovery.
 What happened? Figuring out what happened by doing the cognitive work to review the relationship but also accept the reasons for the failure. Survivors of a broken relationship should write their own story on what happened (Kingma, 1987) which will provide some emotional release and a way to cope with the situation. All this is done to provide some closure to the experience.
 Realize, don't idealize. Use various strategies to lessen the pain of the breakup. One strategy is the silent ridicule where the one left behind imagines a flaw in the other partner and mentally exaggerates it to the point of humor (Phillips & Judd, 1978). Once the person is seen as human with flaws, it's easier to leave him or her behind.
 Prepare to feel better. If there was a sense that something was wrong for a period of time, it can create a sense of relief when the other shoe finally drops. If the person left can get to the point of laughter over the situation, the healing process will break the bonds of misery since it's incompatible with self-imposed mourning (Frankel & Tien, 1993). Look for what was actually funny about the relationship which in turn can accelerate the process of healing.

See also
Relationship forming
Relationship maintenance
Socionics

References

 Baxter, L.A. (1982). Strategies for ending relationship: Two studies, Western Journal of Speech Communication, 46, 223–241.
 Baxter, L.A. (1984). Trajectories of relationship disengagement. Journal of Social and Personal Relationships, 1, 29–48.
 Davis, M.S. (1973). Intimate relations. New York: The Free Press.
 Duck, S. (Ed.). (1982). Personal relations 4: Dissolving personal relationships. New York: Academic Press.
 Frankel, V. & Tien, E. (1993). The heartbreak handbook. New York: Fawcett/Columbine.
 Guerrero, L.K., Andersen, P.A. & Afifi, W.A. (2007) Close Encounters, communication in relationships. Thousand Oaks, CA: Sage Publications.
 Harvey, J.H. (1996). Embracing their memory. Boston: Allyn & Bacon.
 Hill, T., Rubin, Z., Pepln, L.A. (1976). Breakups before marriage: The end of 103 affairs. Journal of Social Issues, 33, 197–198.
 Johnson, M.P. (1982). Social and cognitive features of the dissolution of commitment to relationships. In S. Duck (Ed.), Dissolving personal relationships (pp. 51–73). New York: Academic Press.
 Jones, W.H., & Burdette, M.P. (1994). Betrayal in relationships. In A.L. Weber & J.H. Harvey (Eds.), Perspectives on close relationships (pp. 243–262). Boston: Allyn & Bacon.
 Kingma, D.R. (1987). Coming apart: Why relationships end and how to live through the ending of yours. Berkeley, CA: Conari Press.
 Leick, N., & Davidsen-Nielsen, M. (1991). Healing pain: Attachment, loss, and grief therapy. (David Stoner, Tras.). New York: Tavistock/Routledge.
 Neeld, E.H. (1990). Seven choices: Taking the steps to new life after losing someone you love. New York: Dell Publishing.
 Pennebaker, J. (1990). Opening up: The healing power of confiding to others. New York: Avon Books.
 Phillips, D., & Judd, R. (1978). How to fall out of love. New York: Fawcett Popular Library.
 Rollie, S. S. and S. W. Duck (2006). Stage theories of marital breakdown. Handbook of Divorce and Dissolution of Romantic Relationships. J. H. Harvey and M. A. Fine. Mahwah, NJ., Lawrence Erlbaum Associates: 176-193. 
 Vaughan, D. (1986). Uncoupling: Turning points in intimate relationships. New York: Oxford University Press.
 Weber, A.L. (1992). The account-making process: A phenomenological approach. In T.L. Orbuch (Ed.), Close relationship loss: Theoretical approaches (pp. 174–191). New York: Springer-Verlag.
 Weber, A.L. (1998). Losing, Leaving and Letting Go: Coping with Nonmarital Breakups. In Spitzberg, B.H. & Cupach, W.R. (Ed.), The dark side of close relationships (pp. 267–304). Mahway, NJ: Erlbaum

Communication
Interpersonal conflict